Usatine may refer to:

Richard P. Usatine, American Professor of Family and Community Medicine, Dermatology and Cutaneous Surgery
Usatine Media, a medical mobile app development company that was founded by Dr. Richard P. Usatine and software developer Peter Erickson